The following lists events that happened during 1894 in New Zealand.

Incumbents

Regal and viceregal
Head of State – Queen Victoria
Governor – David Boyle, 7th Earl of Glasgow

Government and law
The 12th New Zealand Parliament continues with the Liberal Party in power.

Speaker of the House – Sir Maurice O'Rorke becomes Speaker for the second time, replacing William Steward
Prime Minister – Richard Seddon
Minister of Finance – Joseph Ward
Chief Justice – Hon Sir James Prendergast

Parliamentary opposition
Leader of the Opposition –  William Russell.

Main centre leaders
Mayor of Auckland – James Holland
Mayor of Christchurch – Eden George followed by Thomas Gapes
Mayor of Dunedin – Henry Fish
Mayor of Wellington – Alfred Brandon

Events 
 30 October: Luxury steamer SS Wairarapa, carrying 230 passengers from Sydney bound for Auckland, is wrecked on Great Barrier Island with the loss of 135 lives.

Undated
American balloonist Leila Adair tours New Zealand. She is possibly the first woman to fly in New Zealand.

New Zealand enacts the world's first national minimum wage law, by the Industrial Conciliation and Arbitration Act.

Arts and literature

Music

Sport
Leonard Cuff is appointed a Founding Member of the International Olympic Committee. He remains the member for both New Zealand and Australia until 1905.

Athletics
National Champions, Men
100 yards – Jack Hempton (Wellington)
250 yards – H. Reeves (Canterbury)
440 yards – W. Low (Otago)
880 yards – W. Low (Otago)
1 mile – C. Morpeth (Otago)
3 miles – C. Morpeth (Otago)
120 yards hurdles – Harold Batger (Wellington)
440 yards hurdles – Harold Batger (Wellington)
Long jump – Wallingford Mendelson (South Canterbury)
High jump – H. Bailey (Wellington)
Pole vault –H. Kingsley (Wanganui)
Shot put – O. McCormack (Wellington)
Hammer throw – O. McCormack (Wellington)

Chess
National Champion: J. Edwards, of Wellington.

Cricket

Golf
 The 2nd National Amateur Championships were held in Christchurch
 Men: H. Macneil (Otago)
 Women : Mrs C. Wilder

Horse racing

Harness racing
 Auckland Trotting Cup (over 3 miles) is won by Tom Hicks

Thoroughbred racing
 New Zealand Cup – Impulse
 New Zealand Derby – Blue Fire
 Auckland Cup – Lottie
 Wellington Cup – Vogengang

Season leaders (1893/94)
Top New Zealand stakes earner – Blue Fire
Leading flat jockey – J. Connop

Lawn Bowls
The pairs championship is held for the first time.
National Champions
Singles – T. Sneddon (Kaituna)
Pairs – T. Sneddon and H. Reid (skip) (Kaituna)
Fours – J. Davidson, A. Owen, J. Wedderspoon and J. Evans (skip) (Caledonian)

Polo
Savile Cup winners – Rangitikei

Rowing
National Champions (Men)
Single sculls – M. Keefe (Auckland)
Double sculls – Union, Christchurch
Coxless pairs – Union, Christchurch
Coxed fours – Lyttelton

Rugby union
Provincial club rugby champions include:

Shooting
Ballinger Belt – Captain E. Smith (Dunedin City Guards)

Soccer
Provincial Champions:
Auckland: Alliance United
Wellington: Wellington Rovers
Otago: Roslyn Dunedin

Swimming
National Champions (Men)
100 yards freestyle – T. Needham (New South Wales, Australia)
220 yards freestyle – W. Gormley (New South Wales, Australia)
440 yards freestyle – W. Gormley (New South Wales, Australia)
880 yards freestyle – W. Gormley (New South Wales, Australia)

Tennis
National championships
Men's singles – M. Fenwicke
Women's singles – M. Spiers
Men's doubles – J. Marshall and P. Marshall
Women's doubles – P. Chapman and M. Nicholson

Births
 2 February – Rongowhakaata Pere Halbert, Māori leader, historian, interpreter, genealogist
 24 February – Victor Spencer, soldier executed in World War I, pardoned in 2000
 1 June – Paraire Karaka Paikea, politician
 14 July: – Paddy Kearins, politician. 
 21 July – Toko Rātana, Rātana church leader and politician
 13 August: – Fintan Patrick Walsh, trade unionist.
 10 November: – Andrew Davidson, educationalist

Deaths
 5 June: Vincent Pyke, politician
 16 September: Robert Hart, politician.

See also
History of New Zealand
List of years in New Zealand
Military history of New Zealand
Timeline of New Zealand history
Timeline of New Zealand's links with Antarctica
Timeline of the New Zealand environment

References
General
 Romanos, J. (2001) New Zealand Sporting Records and Lists. Auckland: Hodder Moa Beckett. 
Specific

External links